The Ukrainian Insurgent Army (abbreviated UPA) was a Ukrainian nationalist paramilitary and later partisan formation founded by the Organization of Ukrainian Nationalists on October 14, 1942. During World War II, it was engaged in guerrilla warfare against the Soviet Union, the Polish Underground State, Communist Poland, and (sometimes) Nazi Germany. The insurgent army arose out of separate militant formations of the Organization of Ukrainian Nationalists—Bandera faction (the OUN-B), other militant national-patriotic formations, some former defectors of the Ukrainian Auxiliary Police, mobilization of local populations and others. The political leadership of the army belonged to the OUN-B. It was a perpetrator of the ethnic cleansing of Poles in Volhynia and Eastern Galicia, murdering tens of thousands of Poles and Jews, mostly women and children. Its official date of creation is 14 October 1942, the day of the Intercession of the Theotokos feast. From December 1941 to July 1943, the Ukrainian People's Revolutionary Army shared the same name (Ukrainian Insurgent Army, or UPA).

Violence was accepted by OUN as a political tool against both foreign and domestic enemies of their cause, which would be achieved by a national revolution led by a dictatorship that would drive out occupying powers and set up a government representing all regions and social groups. The organization began as a resistance group and developed into a guerrilla army. In 1943, the UPA was controlled by the OUN(B) and included people of various political and ideological convictions. Furthermore, it needed the support of the broad masses against both the Germans and the Soviets. Much of its nationalist ideology, including the concept of dictatorship, did not appeal to former Soviet citizens who had experienced Stalinist dictatorship. Because of this opposition, at its Third Extraordinary Grand Assembly on 21–25 August 1943, the OUN(B) condemned "internationalist and fascist national-socialist programs and political concepts" as well as "Russian-Bolshevik communism", and proposed a "system of free peoples and independent states [as] the single best solution to the problem of world order." The new social program did not differ essentially from earlier ones but now emphasized a wide range of social services, worker participation in management, a mixed economy, choice of profession and workplace, and free trade unions. The OUN(B) affirmed that it was fighting for freedom of the press, speech, and thought.
During its existence, the Ukrainian Insurgent Army fought against the Poles and the Soviets as their primary opponents, often collaborating closely with German forces. From February 1943, the organization sometimes fought against the Germans. From late spring 1944, the UPA and Organization of Ukrainian Nationalists-B (OUN-B)—faced with Soviet advances—cooperated with German forces against the Soviets and Poles in the hope of creating an independent Ukrainian state. The OUN played a substantial role in the ethnic cleansing of the Polish population of Volhynia and eastern Galicia, and tried to prevent the ethnic cleansing of Ukrainians from western Galicia.

After the end of World War II, Soviet NKVD units fought against the UPA. The UPA remained active and fought against the People's Republic of Poland until 1947, and against the Soviet Union until 1949. UPA was active throughout the territory of Ukraine with subsections named after the regions they were active in. In Western Ukraine UPA unit was called UPA West; in the centre-southern regions of Podolia, parts of Kyiv region, parts of Zhytomyr region and Odesa - UPA South; in the northern regions of Volhynia, Rivne, parts of Kyiv region, parts of Zhytomyr region UPA North was active; in eastern Ukraine UPA fled north, as Stalinist dictatorship has executed a number of UPA's participants. The members of UPA east joined other UPA units in Dnipro and in Chernihiv region. The UPA was a decentralised movement widespread throughout Ukraine with each regions following somewhat different agenda given the circumstances of constant moving front line and a double thread of the Soviet and Nazi powers.  The UPA was formally disbanded in early September 1949. However, some of its units continued operations until 1956.

In March 2019, surviving UPA members were officially granted the status of veterans by the government of Ukraine.

Another separate, independent UPA also existed in Volhynia from 1941 until July 1943. It was formed in late November 1941, and from the spring of 1942 was a very active Ukrainian nationalist armed group before the formal formation of the UPA in the spring of 1943. This group belonged to the political opponents of the OUN(B) – OUN(UNR), and allied itself politically with OUN(M). Led by Taras Bulba-Borovets, it had links to the Ukrainian National Republic (UNR) in exile. It was renamed the Ukrainian People's Revolutionary Army in July 1943 before being later partially and forcibly absorbed into the UPA of the OUN(B).

Organization 

The UPA's command structure overlapped with that of the underground nationalist political party, the OUN, in a sophisticated centralized network. The UPA was responsible for military operations while the OUN was in charge of administrative duties; each had its own chain of command. The six main departments were military, political, security service, mobilization, supply, and the Ukrainian Red Cross. Despite the division between the UPA and the OUN, there was overlap between their posts and the local OUN and UPA leaders were frequently the same person. Organizational methods were borrowed and adapted from the German, Polish and Soviet military, while UPA units based their training on a modified Red Army field unit manual.

The General Staff, formed at the end of 1943 consisted of operations, intelligence, training, logistics, personnel and political education departments. UPA's largest units, Kurins, consisting of 500-700 soldiers, were equivalent to battalions in a regular army, and its smallest units, Riys (literally bee swarm), with eight to ten soldiers, were equivalent to squads. Occasionally, and particularly in Volyn, during some operations three or more Kurins would unite and form a Zahin or Brigade.

UPA's leaders were: Vasyl Ivakhiv (Spring – 13 of May 1943), Dmytro Klyachkivsky, Roman Shukhevych (January 1944 until 1950) and finally Vasyl Kuk.

In November 1943, the UPA adopted a new structure, creating a Main Military Headquarters and three areas (group) commands: UPA-West, UPA-North and UPA-South. Three military schools for low-level command staff were also established.

In terms of UPA soldiers' social background, 60 percent were peasants of low to moderate means, 20 to 25 percent were from the working class (primarily from the rural lumber and food industries), and 15 percent were members of the intelligentsia (students, urban professionals). The latter group provided a large portion of the UPA's military trainers and officer corps. 

The number of UPA fighters varied. A German Abwehr report from November 1943 estimated that the UPA had 20,000 soldiers other estimates at that time placed the number at 40,000. By the summer of 1944, estimates of UPA membership varied from 25,000 to 30,000 fighters up to 100,000 or even 200,000 soldiers.

Structure 
The Ukrainian Insurgent Army was structured into four units:
 UPA-NorthRegions: Volhynia, Polissia.
 Military District "Turiv"Commander – Maj. Rudyj.Squads: "Bohun", "Pomsta Polissja", "Nalyvajko".
 Military District "Zahrava"Commander – Ptashka (Sylvester Zatovkanjuk).Squads: "Konovaletsj", "Enej", "Dubovyj", "Oleh".
 Military District " Volhynia-South"Commander – Bereza.Squads: "Kruk", "H.".
 UPA-WestRegions: Halychyna, Bukovina, Zakarpattia, Zakerzonia.
 Military District "Lysonja"Commander – Maj. Hrim, V.Kurins: "Holodnojarci", "Burlaky", "Lisovyky", "Rubachi", "Bujni", "Holky".
 Military District "Hoverlja"Commander – Maj. Stepovyj (from 1945 – Major Hmara).Kurins: "Bukovynsjkyj", "Peremoha", "Hajdamaky", "Huculjskyj", "Karpatsjkyj".
 Military District "Black Forest"Commander – Col. Rizun-Hrehit (Mykola Andrusjak).Kurins: "Smertonosci", "Pidkarpatsjkyj", "Dzvony", "Syvulja", "Dovbush", "Beskyd", "Menyky".
 Military District "Makivka"Commander – Maj. Kozak.Kurins: "Ljvy", "Bulava", "Zubry", "Letuny", "Zhuravli", "Bojky of Chmelnytsjkyj", "Basejn".
 Military District "Buh"Commander – Col. VoronnyjKurins: "Druzhynnyky", "Halajda", "Kochovyky", "Perejaslavy", "Tyhry", "Perebyjnis"
 Military District "Sjan"Commander – OrestKurins: "Vovky", "Menyky", Kurin of Ren, Kurin of Eugene.
 UPA-SouthRegions: Khmelnytskyi Oblast, Zhytomyr Oblast, southern region of Kyiv Oblast, southern regions of Ukraine,and especially in cities Odessa, Kryvyi Rih, Dnipropetrovsk, Mariupol, Donetsk.
 Military District "Cholodnyj Jar"Commander – Kost'.Kurins: Kurin of Sabljuk, Kurin of Dovbush.
 Military District "Umanj"Commander – Ostap.Kurins: Kurin of Dovbenko, Kurin of Buvalyj, Kurin of Andrij-Shum.
 Military District "Vinnytsja"Commander – Jasen.Kurins: Kurin of Storchan, Kurin of Mamaj, Kurin of Burevij.
 UPA-EastRegions: northern strip of Zhytomyr Oblast, northern region of Kyiv Oblast, and Chernihiv Oblast.

Greeting 

The greeting "Glory to Ukraine! Glory to the heroes!" appeared in the 1930s among members of the Organization of Ukrainian Nationalists (OUN) and Ukrainian Insurgent Army (UPA) who started using this slogan as a greeting to its members.

Anthem 
The anthem of the Ukrainian Insurgent Army was called the March of Ukrainian Nationalists, also known as We were born in a great hour. The song, written by Oles Babiy, was officially adopted by the leadership of the Organization of Ukrainian Nationalists in 1932.

The organization was a successor of the Ukrainian Sich Riflemen, whose anthem was "Chervona Kalyna". Leaders of the Ukrainian Sich Riflemen Yevhen Konovalets and Andriy Melnyk were founding members of the Organization of Ukrainian Nationalists. For this reason, "Chervona Kalyna" was also used by the Ukrainian Insurgent Army.

Flag 
The battle flag of the UPA was a red-and-black banner. The flag continues to be a symbol of the Ukrainian nationalist movement. The colours of the flag symbolize 'red Ukrainian blood spilled on the black Ukrainian earth. Use of the flag is also a "sign of the stubborn endurance of the Ukrainian national idea even under the grimmest conditions."

Awards 
 Cross of Merit
 Cross of Combat Merit

Military ranks 
The UPA made use of a dual rank system that included functional command position designations and traditional military ranks. The functional system was developed due to an acute shortage of qualified and politically reliable officers during the early stages of organization.

UPA rank structure consisted of at least seven commissioned officer ranks, four non-commissioned officer ranks, and two soldier ranks. The hierarchical order of known ranks and their approximate U.S. Army equivalent is as follows:

The rank scheme provided for three more higher general officer ranks: Heneral-Poruchnyk (Major General), Heneral-Polkovnyk (Lieutenant General), and Heneral-Pikhoty (General with Four Stars).

Armaments 
Initially, the UPA used the weapons collected from the battlefields of 1939 and 1941. Later they bought weapons from peasants and individual soldiers or captured them in combat. Some light weapons were also brought by deserting Ukrainian auxiliary policemen. For the most part, the UPA used light infantry weapons of Soviet and, to a lesser extent, German origin (for which ammunition was less readily obtainable). In 1944, German units armed the UPA directly with captured Soviet arms. Many kurins were equipped with light 51 mm and 82 mm mortars. During large-scale operations in 1943–1944, insurgent forces also used artillery (45 mm and 76.2 mm). In 1943 a light Hungarian tank was used in Volhynia.

In 1944, the Soviets captured a Polikarpov Po-2 aircraft and one armored car and one personnel carrier from UPA; however, it was not stated that they were in operable condition, while no OUN/UPA documents noted the usage of such equipment. By end of World War II in Europe, the NKVD had captured 45 artillery pieces (45 and 76.2 mm calibres) and 423 mortars from the UPA. In the attacks against Polish civilians, axes and pikes were used. However, the light infantry weapon was the basic weapon used by the UPA.

Formation

1941 

In a memorandum from 14 August 1941, the OUN (B) proposed to the Germans, to create a Ukrainian Army "which will join the German Army ... until the latter will win" (preferable translation: "which will unite with the German Army ... until [our] final victory"), in exchange for German recognition of an allied Ukrainian independent state.

At the beginning of October 1941, during the first OUN Conference, the OUN formulated its future strategy. This called for transferring part of its organizational structure underground, in order to avoid conflict with the Germans. It also refrained from open anti-German propaganda activities.

A captured German document of 25 November 1941 (Nuremberg Trial O14-USSR) ordered: "It has been ascertained that the Bandera Movement is preparing a revolt in the Reichskommissariat which has as its ultimate aim the establishment of an independent Ukraine. All functionaries of the Bandera Movement must be arrested at once and, after thorough interrogation, are to be liquidated..."

1942 
At the Second Conference of the OUN(B), held in April 1942, the policies for the "creation, build-up and development of Ukrainian political and future military forces" and "action against partisan activity supported by Moscow" were adopted. Although German policies were criticized, the Soviet partisans were identified as the primary enemy of OUN (B).

The "Military conference of OUN (B)" met in December 1942 near Lviv. The conference resulted in the adoption of a policy for accelerated growth for the establishment of OUN(B)'s military forces. The conference emphasized that "all combat capable population must support, under OUN banners, the struggle against the Bolshevik enemy". On 30 May 1947, the Main Ukrainian Liberation Council (Головна Визвольна Рада) adopted the date of 14 October 1942 as the date of the formation of the UIA, and thus marked as its official anniversary.

Germany 
Despite the stated opinions of Dmytro Klyachkivsky and Roman Shukhevych that the Germans were a secondary threat compared to their main enemies (the communist forces of the Soviet Union and Poland), the Third Conference of the Organization of Ukrainian Nationalists, held near Lviv from 17 to 21 February 1943, decided to begin open warfare against the Germans (OUN fighters had already attacked a German garrison earlier that year on 7 February). Accordingly, on 20 March 1943, the OUN(B) leadership issued secret instructions ordering their members who had joined the collaborationist Ukrainian Auxiliary Police in 1941–1942 to desert with their weapons and join with UPA units in Volhynia. This process often involved armed conflict with German forces trying to prevent this. The number of trained and armed personnel who joined the ranks of the UPA was estimated to be between 4 and 5 thousand.

Anti-German actions were limited to situations where the Germans attacked the Ukrainian population or UPA units. Indeed, according to German general Ernst August Köstring, UPA fighters "fought almost exclusively against German administrative agencies, the German police and the SS in their quest to establish an independent Ukraine controlled by neither Moscow nor Germany."

During the German occupation, the UPA conducted hundreds of raids on police stations and military convoys. In the region of Zhytomyr insurgents were estimated by the German General-Kommissar Leyser to be in control of 80% of the forests and 60% of the farmland.

According to the OUN/UPA, on 12 May 1943, Germans attacked the town of Kolki using several SS-Divisions (SS units operated alongside the German Army who were responsible for intelligence, central security, policing action, and mass extermination), where both sides suffered heavy losses. Soviet partisans reported the reinforcement of German auxiliary forces at Kolki from the end of April until the middle of May 1943.

In June 1943, German SS and police forces under the command of Erich von dem Bach, the head of Himmler-directed Bandenbekämpfung ("bandit warfare"), attempted to destroy UPA-North in Volhynia during Operation BB (Bandenbekämpfung). According to Ukrainian claims, the initial stage of the operation produced no results whatsoever. This development was the subject of several discussions by Himmler's staff that resulted in General von dem Bach-Zelewski being sent to Ukraine. He failed to eliminate the UPA, which grew steadily, and the Germans, apart from terrorizing the civilian population, were virtually limited to defensive actions.

From July through September 1943, in an estimated 74 clashes between German forces and the UPA, the Germans lost more than 3,000 men killed or wounded, while the UPA lost 1,237 killed or wounded. According to post-war estimates, the UPA had the following number of clashes with the Germans in mid-to-late 1943 in Volhynia: 35 in July, 24 in August, 15 in September and 47 during October–November. In the fall of 1943, clashes between the UPA and the Germans declined, so that Erich Koch in his November 1943 report and New Year 1944 speech could claim that "nationalistic bands in forests do not pose any major threat" for the Germans.

In the Autumn of 1943, some detachments of the UPA attempted to find rapprochement with the Germans. Although doing so was condemned by an OUN/UPA order on 25 November 1943, these actions did not end. In early 1944, UPA forces in several Western regions cooperated with the German Wehrmacht, Waffen SS, SiPo and SD. However, in the winter and spring of 1944 it would be incorrect to say that there was a complete cessation of armed conflict between UPA and German forces, as the UPA continued to defend Ukrainian villages against the repressive actions of the German administration.

For example, on 20 January, 200 German soldiers on their way to the Ukrainian village of Pyrohivka were forced to retreat after a several-hour long firefight with 80 UPA soldiers after having lost 30 killed and wounded. In March–July 1944, a senior leader of OUN(B) in Galicia conducted negotiations with SD and SS officials, resulting in a German decision to supply the UPA with arms and ammunition. In May of that year, the OUN issued instructions to "switch the struggle, which had been conducted against the Germans, completely into a struggle against the Soviets."

In a top-secret memorandum, General-Major Brigadeführer Brenner wrote in mid-1944 to SS-Obergruppenführer General Hans-Adolf Prützmann, the highest ranking German SS officer in Ukraine, that "The UPA has halted all attacks on units of the German army. The UPA systematically sends agents, mainly young women, into the enemy-occupied territory, and the results of the intelligence are communicated to Department 1c of the [German] Army Group" on the southern front. By the autumn of 1944, the German press was full of praise for the UPA for their anti-Bolshevik successes, referring to the UPA fighters as "Ukrainian fighters for freedom" After the front had passed, by the end of 1944 the Germans supplied the OUN/UPA by air with arms and equipment. In the region of Ivano-Frankivsk, there even existed a small landing strip for German transport planes. Some German personnel trained in terrorist and intelligence activities behind Soviet lines, as well as some OUN-B leaders, were also transported through this channel.

Adopting a strategy analogous to that of the Chetnik leader General Draža Mihailović, the UPA limited its actions against the Germans in order to better prepare itself for and engage in the struggle against the communists. Because of this, although the UPA managed to limit German activities to a certain extent, it failed to prevent the Germans from deporting approximately 500,000 people from Western Ukraine and from economically exploiting Western Ukraine. Due to its focus on the Soviets as the principal threat, UPA's anti-German struggle did not contribute significantly to the liberation of Ukrainian territories by Soviet forces.

Poland

Massacres of Poles in Volhynia and Eastern Galicia 

In 1943, the UPA adopted a policy of massacring and expelling the Polish population. The decision of ethnic cleansing of the area east of the Bug River was taken by the Ukrainian Insurgent Army early in 1943. In March 1943, the OUN(B) (specifically Mykola Lebed) imposed a collective death sentence on all Poles living in the former east of the Second Polish Republic, and a few months later, local units of the UPA were instructed to complete the operation soon. Among those who were behind the decision, Polish investigators singled out Dmytro Klyachkivsky, Vasyl Ivakhov, Ivan Lytvynchuk and Petro Oliynyk.

The ethnic cleansing operation against the Poles began on a large scale in Volhynia in late February (or early Spring) of that year and lasted until the end of 1944. Taras Bulba-Borovets, the founder of the UPA, criticized the attacks as soon as they began: 

11 July 1943 was one of the deadliest days of the massacres, with UPA units marching from village to village, killing Polish civilians. On that day, UPA units surrounded and attacked 99 Polish villages and settlements in three counties – Kowel, Horochów, and Włodzimierz Wołyński. On the following day, 50 additional villages were attacked. In January 1944, the UPA campaign of ethnic cleansing spread to the neighbouring province of Galicia. Unlike in Volhynia, where Polish villages were destroyed and their inhabitants murdered without warning, Poles in eastern Galicia were in some instances given the choice of fleeing or being killed. Ukrainian peasants sometimes joined the UPA in the violence, and large bands of armed marauders, unaffiliated with the UPA, brutalized civilians. In other cases however, Ukrainian civilians took significant steps to protect their Polish neighbours, either by hiding them during the UPA raids or vouching that the Poles were actually Ukrainians.

The methods used by UPA to carry out the massacres were particularly brutal and were committed indiscriminately without any restraint. Historian Norman Davies describes the killings: "Villages were torched. Roman Catholic priests were axed or crucified. Churches were burned with all their parishioners. Isolated farms were attacked by gangs carrying pitchforks and kitchen knives. Throats were cut. Pregnant women were bayoneted. Children were cut in two. Men were ambushed in the field and led away." In total, the estimated numbers of Polish and Jewish civilians killed in Volhynia and Galicia is between 50,000 and 100,000.

Victims of the UPA included Ukrainians who did not adhere to its form of nationalism and so were considered traitors.

After the initiation of the massacres, Polish self-defense units responded in kind. Estimates of Ukrainians killed in acts of reprisal range from 2,000 to 30,000. 

On 22 July 2016, the Sejm of the Republic of Poland passed a resolution declaring the massacres committed by UPA a genocide.

Post-war 

After Galicia had been taken over by the Red Army, many units of UPA abandoned the anti-Polish course of action and some even began cooperating with local Polish anti-communist resistance against the Soviets and the NKVD. Many Ukrainians, who had nothing to do with earlier massacres against the Poles, seeking to defend themselves against communists, joined UPA after the war on both the Soviet and Polish sides of the border. Local agreements between the UPA and the Polish post-AK units began to appear as early as April/May 1945 and in some places lasted until 1947, such as in the Lublin region. One of the most notable joint actions of UPA and the post-AK Freedom and Independence (WiN) organization took place in May 1946, when the two partisan formations coordinated their attack and took over of the city of Hrubieszów.

The cooperation between UPA and the post-AK underground came about partly as a response to increasing communist terror and the deportations of Ukrainians to the Soviet Union, and Poles into the new socialist Poland. According to official statistics, between 1944 and 1956 around 488,000 Ukrainians and 789,000 Poles were transferred. On the territories of present-day Poland, 8–12 thousand Ukrainians were killed and 6–8 thousand Poles, between 1943 and 1947. However, unlike in Volhynia, most of the casualties occurred after 1944 and involved UPA soldiers and Ukrainian civilians on one side, and members of the Polish communist security services (UB) and border forces (WOP). Out of the 2,200 Poles who died in the fighting between 1945 and 1948, only a few hundred were civilians, with the remainder being functionaries or soldiers of the Communist regime in Poland.

Soviet Union

German occupation 

The total number of local Soviet Partisans acting in Western Ukraine was never high, due to the region enduring only two years of German rule (in some places even less).

In 1943, the Soviet partisan leader Sydir Kovpak was sent to the Carpathian Mountains, with help from Nikita Khrushchev. He described his mission to western Ukraine in his book Vid Putivlia do Karpat (From Putivl to the Carpathian Mountains). Well armed by supplies delivered to secret airfields, he formed a group consisting of several thousand men which moved deep into the Carpathians. Attacks by the German air force and military forced Kovpak to break up his force into smaller units in 1944; these groups were attacked by UPA units on their way back. Soviet intelligence agent Nikolai Kuznetsov was captured and executed by UPA members after unwittingly entering their camp while wearing a Wehrmacht officer uniform.

Fighting 
As the Red Army approached Galicia, the UPA avoided clashes with the regular units of the Soviet military. Instead, the UPA focused its energy on NKVD units and Soviet officials of all levels, from NKVD and military officers to the school teachers and postal workers attempting to establish Soviet administration.

In March 1944, UPA insurgents mortally wounded front commander Army General Nikolai Vatutin, who liberated Kyiv when he led Soviet forces in the Second battle of Kiev . Several weeks later an NKVD battalion was annihilated by the UPA near Rivne. This resulted in a full-scale operation in the spring of 1944, initially involving 30,000 Soviet troops against the UPA in Volhynia. Estimates of casualties vary depending on the source. In a letter to the state defence committee of the USSR, Lavrentiy Beria stated that in spring 1944 clashes between Soviet forces and UPA resulted in 2,018 killed and 1,570 captured UPA fighters and only 11 Soviets killed and 46 wounded. Soviet archives show that a captured UPA member stated that he received reports about UPA losses of 200 fighters while the Soviet forces lost 2,000. The first significant sabotage operations against communications of the Soviet Army before their offensive against the Germans was conducted by the UPA in April–May 1944. Such actions were promptly stopped by the Soviet Army and NKVD troops, after which the OUN/UPA submitted an order to temporarily cease anti-Soviet activities and prepare for the further struggle against the Soviets.

Despite heavy casualties on both sides during the initial clashes, the struggle was inconclusive. New large-scale actions of the UPA, especially in Ternopil Oblast, were launched in July–August 1944, when the Red Army advanced West. By the autumn of 1944, UPA forces enjoyed virtual freedom of movement over an area of 160,000 square kilometers in size and home to over 10 million people and had established a shadow government.

In November 1944, Khrushchev launched the first of several large-scale Soviet assaults on the UPA throughout Western Ukraine, involving according to OUN/UPA estimates at least 20 NKVD combat divisions supported by artillery and armoured units. They blockaded villages and roads and set forests on fire. Soviet archival data states that on 9 October 1944, one NKVD Division, eight NKVD brigades, and an NKVD cavalry regiment with a total of 26,304 NKVD soldiers were stationed in Western Ukraine. In addition, two regiments with 1,500 and 1,200 persons, one battalion (517 persons) and three armoured trains with 100 additional soldiers each, as well as one border guard regiment and one unit were starting to relocate there in order to reinforce them.

During late 1944 and the first half of 1945, according to Soviet data, the UPA suffered approximately 89,000 killed, approximately 91,000 captured, and approximately 39,000 surrendered while the Soviet forces lost approximately 12,000 killed, approximately 6,000 wounded and 2,600 MIA. In addition, during this time, according to Soviet data UPA actions resulted in the killing of 3,919 civilians and the disappearance of 427 others. Despite the heavy losses, as late as summer 1945, many battalion-size UPA units still continued to control and administer large areas of territory in Western Ukraine. In February 1945 the UPA issued an order to liquidate kurins (battalions) and sotnya's (companies) and to act predominantly by chotys (platoons).

Spring 1945–late 1946 

After Germany surrendered in May 1945, the Soviet authorities turned their attention to insurgencies taking place in Ukraine and the Baltics. Combat units were reorganised and special forces were sent in. One of the major complications that arose was the local support the UPA had from the population.

Areas of UPA activity were depopulated. The estimates on numbers deported vary; officially Soviet archives state that between 1944 and 1952 a total of 182,543 people were deported while other sources indicate the number may have been as high as to 500,000.

Mass arrests of suspected UPA informants or family members were conducted; between February 1944 and May 1946 over 250,000 people were arrested in Western Ukraine. Those arrested typically experienced beatings or other violence. Those suspected of being UPA members underwent torture; reports exist of some prisoners being burned alive. The many arrested women believed to be affiliating with the UPA were subjected to torture, deprivation, and rape at the hands of Soviet security in order to "break" them and get them to reveal UPA members' identities and locations or to turn them into Soviet double-agents. Mutilated corpses of captured rebels were put on public display. Ultimately, between 1944 and 1952 alone as many as 600,000 people may have been arrested in Western Ukraine, with about one-third executed and the rest imprisoned or exiled.

The UPA responded to the Soviet methods by unleashing their own terror against Soviet activists, suspected collaborators and their families. This work was particularly attributed to the Sluzhba Bezbeky (SB), the anti-espionage wing of the UPA. In a typical incident in the Lviv region, in front of horrified villagers, UPA troops gouged out the eyes of two entire families suspected of reporting on insurgent movements to Soviet authorities, before hacking their bodies to pieces. Due to public outrage concerning these violent punitive acts, the UPA stopped the practice of killing the families of collaborators by mid-1945. Other victims of the UPA included Soviet activists sent to Galicia from other parts of the Soviet Union; heads of village Soviets, those sheltering or feeding Red Army personnel, and even people turning food into collective farms. The effect of such terrorist acts was such that people refused to take posts as village heads, and until the late 1940s villages chose single men with no dependants as their leaders.

The UPA also proved to be especially adept at assassinating key Soviet administrative officials. According to NKVD data, between February 1944 and December 1946 11,725 Soviet officers, agents and collaborators were assassinated and 2,401 were "missing", presumed kidnapped, in Western Ukraine. In one county in Lviv region alone, from August 1944 until January 1945 Ukrainian rebels killed 10 members of the Soviet active and a secretary of the county Communist party, and also kidnapped four other officials. The UPA travelled at will throughout the area. In this county, there were no courts, no prosecutor's office, and the local NKVD only had three staff members.

According to a 1946 report by Khrushchev's deputy for West Ukrainian affairs A.A. Stoiantsev, out of 42,175 operations and ambushes against the UPA by Destruction battalions in Western Ukraine, only 10 percent had positive results – in the vast majority there was either no contact or the individual unit was disarmed and pro-Soviet leaders murdered or kidnapped. Morale amongst the NKVD in Western Ukraine was particularly low. Even within the dangerous context of Soviet state service in the late-Stalin era, West Ukraine was considered to be a "hardship post", and personnel files reveal higher rates of transfer requests, alcoholism, nervous breakdowns, and refusal to serve among NKVD field agents there at that time.

The first success of the Soviet authorities came in early 1946 in the Carpathians, which were blockaded from 11 January until 10 April. The UPA operating there ceased to exist as a combat unit. The continuous heavy casualties elsewhere forced the UPA to split into small units consisting of 100 soldiers. Many of the troops demobilized and returned home, when the Soviet Union offered three amnesties during 1947–1948.

By 1946, the UPA was reduced to a core group of 5–10 thousand fighters, and large-scale UPA activity shifted to the Soviet-Polish border. Here, in 1947, they killed the Polish Communist deputy defence minister General Karol Świerczewski. In spring 1946, the OUN/UPA established contacts with the Intelligence services of France, Great Britain and the USA.

End of UPA resistance 

The turning point in the struggle against the UPA came in 1947 when the Soviets established an intelligence gathering network within the UPA and shifted the focus of their actions from mass terror to infiltration and espionage. After 1947 the UPA's activity began to subside. On May 30, 1947, Shukhevych issued instructions for joining the OUN and UPA in underground warfare. In 1947–1948 UPA resistance was weakened enough to allow the Soviets to begin implementation of large-scale collectivization throughout Western Ukraine.

In 1948, the Soviet central authorities purged local officials who had mistreated peasants and engaged in "vicious methods". At the same time, Soviet agents planted within the UPA had taken their toll on morale and on the UPA's effectiveness. According to the writing of one slain Ukrainian rebel, "the Bolsheviks tried to take us from within...you can never know exactly in whose hands you will find yourself. From such a network of spies, the work of whole teams is often penetrated...". In November 1948, the work of Soviet agents led to two important victories against the UPA: the defeat and deaths of the heads of the most active UPA network in Western Ukraine, and the removal of "Myron", the head of the UPA's counter-intelligence SB unit.

The Soviet authorities tried to win over the local population by making a significant economic investments in Western Ukraine, and by setting up rapid reaction groups in many regions to combat the UPA. According to one retired MVD major, "By 1948 ideologically we had the support of most of the population."

The UPA's leader, Roman Shukhevych, was killed during an ambush near Lviv on 5 March 1950. Although sporadic UPA activity continued until the mid-1950s, after Shukhevich's death the UPA rapidly lost its fighting capability. An assessment of UPA manpower by Soviet authorities on 17 April 1952 claimed that UPA/OUN had only 84 fighting units consisting of 252 persons. The UPA's last commander, Vasyl Kuk, was captured on 24 May 1954. Despite the existence of some insurgent groups, according to a report by the MGB of the Ukrainian SSR, the "liquidation of armed units and OUN underground was accomplished by the beginning of 1956".

NKVD units dressed as UPA fighters are known to have committed atrocities against the civilian population in order to discredit the UPA. Among these NKVD units were those composed of former UPA fighters working for the NKVD. The Security Service of Ukraine (SBU) recently published information that about 150 such special groups consisting of 1,800 people operated until 1954.

Prominent people killed by UPA insurgents during the anti-Soviet struggle included Metropolitan Oleksiy (Hromadsky) of the Ukrainian Autonomous Orthodox Church, killed while travelling in a German convoy, and pro-Soviet writer Yaroslav Halan.

In 1951 CIA covert operations chief Frank Wisner estimated that some 35,000 Soviet police troops and Communist party cadres had been eliminated by guerrillas affiliated with the Ukrainian Insurgent Army in the period after the end of World War II. Official Soviet figures for the losses inflicted by all types of Ukrainian nationalists during the period 1944–1953 referred to 30,676 persons; amongst them were 687 NKGB-MGB personnel, 1,864 NKVD-MVD personnel, 3,199 Soviet Army, Border Guards, and NKVD-MVD troops, 241 communist party leaders, 205 komsomol leaders and 2,590 members of self-defence units. According to Soviet data, the remaining losses were among civilians, including 15,355 peasants and kolkhozniks. Soviet archives state that between February 1944 and January 1946 the Soviet forces conducted 39,778 operations against the UPA, during which they killed a total of 103,313, captured a total of 8,370 OUN members and captured a total of 15,959 active insurgents.

Many UPA members were imprisoned in the Gulag. They actively participated in Gulag uprisings (Kengir uprising, Norilsk uprising, Vorkuta uprising).

Soviet infiltration 
In 1944–1945 the NKVD carried out 26,693 operations against the Ukrainian underground. These resulted in the deaths of 22,474 Ukrainian soldiers and the capture of 62,142 prisoners. During this time the NKVD formed special groups known as spetshrupy made up of former Soviet partisans. The goal of these groups was to discredit and disorganize the OUN and UPA. In August 1944, Sydir Kovpak was placed under NKVD authority. Posing as Ukrainian insurgents, these special formations used violence against the civilian population of Western Ukraine. In June 1945 there were 156 such special groups with 1,783 members.

From December 1945 to 1946, 15,562 operations were carried out in which 4,200 were killed and more than 9,400 were arrested. From 1944 to 1953, the Soviets killed 153,000 and arrested 134,000 members of the UPA. 66,000 families (204,000 people) were forcibly deported to Siberia and half a million people were subject to repression. In the same period, Polish communist authorities deported 450,000 people. Soviet infiltration of British intelligence also meant that MI6 assisted in training some of the guerrillas in parachuting and unmarked planes used to drop them into Ukraine from bases in Cyprus and Malta, were counter-acted by the fact that one MI6 agent with knowledge of the operation was Kim Philby. Working with Anthony Blunt, he alerted Soviet security forces about planned drops. Ukrainian guerrillas were intercepted and most were executed.

Holocaust 

The OUN pursued a policy of infiltrating the German police to obtain weapons and training for fighters. In that role, it helped the Germans to carry out the Holocaust. The Ukrainian auxiliary police, working for the Germans, played a crucial supporting role in the murder of 200,000 Jews in Volhynia in the second half of 1942. Most of the police deserted in the following spring and joined UPA.

Numerous accounts ascribe to the UPA a role in the killing of Ukrainian Jews under the German occupation. According to Ray Brandon, co-editor of The Shoah in Ukraine, "Jews in hiding in Volhynia saw the UPA as a threat."

With the first antisemitic ideology and acts traced back to the Russian Civil War, by 1940–41 the publications of Ukrainian terrorist organizations became explicitly antisemitic. German documents of the period give the impression that Ukrainian ultranationalists were indifferent to the plight of the Jews and would either kill them or help them, whichever was more appropriate for their political goals.

According to John Paul Himka, OUN militias were responsible for a wave of anti-Jewish pogroms in Lviv in 1941, in what it was at the time occupied Poland, and other areas that claimed thousands of lives. The OUN had repudiated pogroms but changed its stand when the Germans, with whom the OUN sought an alliance, demanded participation in them. According to Unian.net, recently declassified documents have shown that the OUN (Organization of Ukrainian Nationalists) was most likely not strongly involved in anti-Jewish activities in 1941.

Jews played an important role in the Soviet partisan movement in Volhynia and participated in its actions. According to Timothy D. Snyder, the Soviet partisans were known for their brutality by retaliating against entire villages suspected of working with the Germans, killing individuals deemed to be collaborators, and provoking the Germans to attack villages. UPA would later attempt to match that brutality. By early 1943, the OUN had entered into open armed conflict with Nazi Germany. According to Ukrainian historian and former UPA soldier Lew Shankowsky, immediately upon assuming the position of commander of the UPA in August 1943, Roman Shukhevych issued an order banning participation in anti-Jewish activities. No written record of this order, however, has been found. In 1944, the OUN formally "rejected racial and ethnic exclusivity". Nevertheless, Jews hiding from the Germans with Poles in Polish villages were often killed by UPA along with their Polish saviors, although in at least one case, they were spared as the Poles were murdered.

Despite the earlier anti-Jewish statements by the OUN and its involvement in the killing of some Jews, there were cases of Jewish participation within the ranks of the UPA, some of whom held high positions. According to journalist and former fighter Leo Heiman, some Jews fought for the UPA, and others included medical personal. These included Dr. Margosh, who headed UPA-West's medical service, Dr. Marksymovich, who was the Chief Physician of the UPA's officer school, and Dr. Abraham Kum, the director of an underground hospital in the Carpathians. The latter individual was the recipient of the UPA's Golden Cross of Merit. Some Jews who fled the ghettos for the forests were killed by members of the UPA.

According to Filip Friedman, many Jews, particularly those whose skills were useful to UPA, were sheltered by them. It has been claimed that the UPA sometimes executed its Jewish personnel, but Friedman evaluated such claims as either uncorroborated or mistaken. However, it has been said by the historian Daniel Romanovsky that in late 1943, the commander of the UPA, Shukhevych, announced a verbal order to destroy the Poles, Jews and Gypsies with the exception to medical personnel, and later fighters executed personnel at the approach of the Soviet Army.

According to Herbert Romerstein, Soviet propaganda complained about Zionist membership in the UPA, and during the persecution of Jews in the early 1950s, they described the alleged connection between Jewish and Ukrainian nationalists.

One well-known claimed example of Jewish participation in the UPA was most likely a hoax, according to sources such as Friedman. According to the report, Stella Krenzbach, the daughter of a rabbi and a Zionist, joined the UPA as a nurse and intelligence agent. She is alleged to have written, "I attribute the fact that I am alive today and devoting all the strength of my thirty-eight years to a free Israel only to God and the Ukrainian Insurgent Army. I became a member of the heroic UPA on 7 November 1943. In our group I counted twelve Jews, eight of whom were doctors". Later, Friedman concluded that Krenzbach was a fictional character, as the only evidence for her existence was in an OUN paper. No one knew of such an employee at the Ministry of Foreign Affairs, where she supposedly worked after the war. A Jew, Leiba Dubrovskii, pretended to be Ukrainian.

Reconciliation 

During the following years, the UPA was officially taboo in the Soviet Union, mentioned only as a terrorist organization. Since Ukraine's independence in 1991, there have been heated debates about the possible award of official recognition to former UPA members as legitimate combatants, with the accompanying pensions and benefits due to war veterans. UPA veterans have also striven to hold parades and commemorations of their own, especially in Western Ukraine. This, in turn, led to opposition from Soviet Army veterans and some Ukrainian politicians, particularly from the south and east of the country.

Recently, attempts to reconcile former Armia Krajowa and UPA soldiers have been made by both the Ukrainian and Polish sides. Individual former UPA members have expressed their readiness for a mutual apology. Some of the past soldiers of both organisations have met and asked for forgiveness for their past misdeeds. Restorations of graves and cemeteries in Poland where fallen UPA soldiers were buried have been agreed to by the Polish side.

2019 official veteran status 
In late March 2019 former members of the Ukrainian Insurgent Army (and other living former members of Ukrainian irregular nationalist armed groups that were active during World War II and the first decade after the war) were officially granted the status of veterans. This meant that for the first time they could receive veteran benefits, including free public transport, subsidized medical services, annual monetary aid, and public utility discounts (and will enjoy the same social benefits as former Ukrainian soldiers who served in the Red Army of the Soviet Union).

There had been several previous attempts to provide former Ukrainian nationalist fighters with official veteran status, especially during the 2005–2009 administration of President Viktor Yushenko, but all failed.

Prior to December 2018 legally only former UPA members who "participated in hostilities against Nazi invaders in occupied Ukraine in 1941–1944, who did not commit crimes against humanity and were rehabilitated" were recognized as war veterans.

Monuments for combatants 
Without waiting for official notice from Kyiv, many regional authorities have already decided to approach the UPA's history on their own. In many western cities and villages monuments, memorials and plaques to the leaders and troops of the UPA have been erected, including a monument to Stepan Bandera himself which opened in October 2007. In eastern Ukraine's city of Kharkiv, a memorial to the soldiers of the UPA was erected in 1992. In late 2006, the Lviv city administration announced the future transference of the tombs of Stepan Bandera, Yevhen Konovalets, Andriy Melnyk and other key leaders of the OUN/UPA to a new area of Lychakiv Cemetery specifically dedicated to Ukrainian nationalists.

In response, many southern and eastern provinces, although the UPA had not operated in those regions, have responded by opening memorials of their own dedicated to the UPA's victims. The first one, "The Shot in the Back", was unveiled by the Communist Party of Ukraine in Simferopol, Crimea in September 2007. In 2008, one was erected in Svatove, Luhansk oblast, and another in Luhansk on 8 May 2010 by the city deputy, Arsen Klinchaev, and the Party of Regions. The unveiling ceremony was attended by Vice Prime Minister Viktor Tykhonov, the leader of the parliamentary faction of the Pro-Russian Party of Regions Oleksandr Yefremov, Russian State Duma deputy Konstantin Zatulin, Luhansk Regional Governor Valerii Holenko, and Luhansk Mayor Serhii Kravchenko.

Monuments commemorating Polish victims 
Polish survivors from Wołyn and Galicia who lived through the massacres, constructed monuments and memorial tables in the places where they settled after the war, such as Warsaw, Wrocław, Sanok and Kłodzko.

Commemoration in Ukraine 

According to John Armstrong, "If one takes into account the duration, geographical extent, and intensity of activity, the UPA very probably is the most important example of forceful resistance to an established Communist regime prior to the decade of fierce Afghan resistance beginning in 1979... the Hungarian revolution of 1956 was, of course, far more important, involving to some degree a population of nine million... however it lasted only a few weeks. In contrast, the more-or-less effective anti-Communist activity of the Ukrainian resistance forces lasted from mid-1944 until 1950".

On 10 January 2008, Ukrainian President Viktor Yushchenko submitted a draft law "on the official Status of Fighters for Ukraine's Independence from the 1920s to the 1990s". Under the draft, persons who took part in political, guerrilla, underground and combat activities for the freedom and independence of Ukraine from 1920 to 1990 as part of or assisting the following:
 Ukrainian Military Organization (UVO)
 Karpatska Sich
 OUN
 UPA
 Ukrainian Main Liberation Army

They will be recognised as war veterans.

In 2007, the Security Service of Ukraine (SBU) set up a special working group to study archive documents of the activity of the Organization of Ukrainian Nationalists (OUN) and the Ukrainian Insurgent Army (UPA) to make public original sources.

Since 2006, the SBU has been actively involved in declassifying documents relating to the operations of Soviet security services and the history of the liberation movement in Ukraine. The SBU Information Centre provides an opportunity for scholars to get acquainted with electronic copies of archive documents. The documents are arranged by topics (1932–1933 Holodomor, OUN/UPA Activities, Repression in Ukraine, Movement of Dissident).

Since September 2009, Ukrainian schoolchildren take a more extensive course of the history of the Holodomor and the fighters of the OUN and the UPA fighters.

Yushchenko took part in the celebration of the 67th anniversary of the UPA and the 65th anniversary of Ukrainian Supreme Liberation Council on 14 October 2009.

To commemorate National Unity Day on 22 January 2010, Yushchenko awarded Bandera the Hero of Ukraine honor posthumously. A district administrative court in Donetsk cancelled the presidential decree granting the honor to Bandera on 2 April 2010. The lawyer Vladimir Olentsevych argued in a lawsuit that the honor is the highest state award that is granted exclusively to citizens of Ukraine. Bandera was not a Ukrainian citizen, as he was killed in exile in 1959 before the 1991 Declaration of Independence of Ukraine.

On 16 January 2012, the Higher Administrative Court of Ukraine upheld the presidential decree of 28 January 2010 "About recognition of OUN members and soldiers of the Ukrainian Insurgent Army as participants in the struggle for independence of Ukraine" after it was challenged by the leader of the Progressive Socialist Party of Ukraine, Nataliya Vitrenko, recognising the UPA as war combatants.

On 10 October 2014, the date of 14 October as Defenders of Ukraine Day was confirmed by Presidential decree, officially granting state sanction to the date of the anniversary of the raising of the Insurgent Army, which has been celebrated in the past by Ukrainian Cossacks as the Feast of the Intercession of the Virgin Mary.

On 15 May 2015, Ukrainian President Petro Poroshenko signed a bill into law that provides "public recognition to anyone who fought for Ukrainian independence in the 20th century", including Ukrainian Insurgent Army combatants.  
In Kyiv, Lviv, Ivano-Frankivsk and Zhytomyr, the UPA flag may be displayed on government buildings "on certain holidays".

In June 2017, the Kyiv City Council renamed the city's General Vatutin Avenue into Roman Shukhevych Avenue.

In December 2018, Poroshenko confirmed the status of veterans and combatants for independence of Ukraine for UPA fighters.

In late 2018, the Lviv Oblast Council decided to declare the year of 2019 to be the year of Bandera.

On 5 March 2021, the Ternopil City Council named the largest stadium in the city of Ternopil after Roman Shukhevych as the Roman Shukhevych Ternopil city stadium. On 16 March 2021, the Lviv Oblast Council approved the renaming of their largest stadium after Roman Shukhevych.

Popular culture 
The Ukrainian black metal band Drudkh recorded a song entitled Ukrainian Insurgent Army on its 2006 release, Кров у Наших Криницях (Blood in our wells), dedicated to Stepan Bandera. Ukrainian Neo-Nazi black metal band Nokturnal Mortum have a song titled "Hailed Be the Heroes" (Слава героям) on the Weltanschauung/Мировоззрение album which contains lyrics pertaining to World War II and Western Ukraine (Galicia), and its title, Slava Heroyam, is a traditional UPA salute.

Two Czech films by František Vláčil, Shadows of the Hot Summer (Stíny horkého léta, 1977) and The Little Shepherd Boy from the Valley (Pasáček z doliny, 1983) are set in 1947, and feature UPA guerrillas in significant supporting roles. The first film resembles Sam Peckinpah's Straw Dogs (1971), in that it is about a farmer whose family is taken hostage by five UPA guerrillas, and he has to resort to his own ingenuity, plus reserves of violence that he never knew he possessed, to defeat them. In the second, the shepherd boy (actually a cowherd) imagines that a group of UPA guerrillas is made up of fairytale characters of his grandfather's stories, and that their leader is the Goblin King.

Also films such as Neskorenyi ("The Undefeated"), Zalizna Sotnia ("The Company of Heroes") and Atentat ("Assassination. An Autumn Murder in Munich") feature more description about the role of UPA on their terrain. The Undefeated is about the life of Roman Shuhevych and the hunt for him by both German and Soviet forces, The Company of Heroes shows how UPA soldiers had everyday life as they fight against Armia Krajowa, Assassination is about the life of Stepan Bandera and how KGB agents murdered him.

The red-and-black battle flag of the Ukrainian Insurgent Army was a popular symbol among Euromaidan protesters, and the wartime insurgents have acted as a large inspiration for them. Serhy Yekelchyk of the University of Victoria says the use of UPA imagery and slogans was more of a potent symbol of protest against the current government and Russia rather than adulation for the insurgents themselves, explaining "The reason for the sudden prominence of [UPA symbolism] in Kyiv is that it is the strongest possible expression of protest against the pro-Russian orientation of the current government."

Films 
 1951 – Akce B (Czechoslovakia)
 1961 – Ogniomistrz Kaleń (Polish People's Republic)
 1962 – Zerwany most (Polish People's Republic)
 1968 – Annychka (USSR)
 1970 – The White Bird Marked with Black (USSR)
 1976 – The Troubled Month of Veresen (USSR)
 1977 – Shadows of the Hot Summer (Czechoslovakia)
 1983 – The Little Shepherd Boy from the Valley (Czechoslovakia)
 1991 – The Last Bunker (Ukraine)
 1991 – Carpathian Gold (Ukraine)
 1992 – Cherry Nights (Ukraine)
 1993 – Memories about UPA (Ukraine)
 1994 – Goodbye, Girl (Ukraine)
 1995 – Assassination. An Autumn Murder in Munich (Ukraine)
 1995 – Executed Dawns (Ukraine)
 2000 – The Undefeated (Ukraine)
 2004 – One – the soldier in the field (Ukraine)
 2004 – The Company of Heroes (Ukraine)
 2004 – Between Hitler and Stalin (Canada)
 2006 – Sobor on the Blood (Ukraine)
 2006 – OUN – UPA war on two fronts (Ukraine)
 2006 – Freedom or death! (Ukraine)
 2007 – UPA. Third Force (Ukraine)
 2010 – We are from the Future 2 (Russia)
 2010 – Banderovci (Czech Republic)
 2012 – Security Service of OUN. "Closed Doors" (Ukraine)
 2016 – Wołyń (Poland)

Fiction 
 Fire Poles by Roman Ivanchuk, 2006.

Songs 
The most obvious characteristic of the insurgent songs genre is the theme of rising up against occupying powers, enslavement and tyranny. Insurgent songs express an open call to battle and to revenge against the enemies of Ukraine, as well as love for the motherland and devotion to her revolutionary leaders (Bandera, Chuprynka and others). UPA actions, heroic deeds of individual soldiers, the hard underground life, longing for one's girl, family or boy are also important subject of this genre.
 Taras Zhytynsky "To sons of UPA"
 Tartak "Not saying to anybody"
 Folk song "To the source of Dniester"
 Drudkh – "Ukrainian Insurgent Army"

See also 

 Banderivtsi
 Defenders Day (Ukraine)
 Galicia (Eastern Europe)
 Zakerzonia
 Marianna Dolińska
 List of Nazi monuments in Canada

Notes

References

Citations

Books

English 

 
 
 
 Jeffrey Burds (1997). "Agentura: Soviet Informants' Networks & the Ukrainian Underground in Galicia, 1944-48", East European Politics and Societies v.11
 Volodymyr Viatrovych, Roman Hrytskiv, Ihor Derevianyj, Ruslan Zabilyj, Andrij Sova, Petro Sodol'. The Ukrainian Insurgent Army: A History of Ukraine's Unvanquished Freedom Fighters (exhibition brochure). Lviv 2009.

Ukrainian 

 Антонюк Ярослав Діяльність СБ ОУН на Волині. –Луцьк : "Волинська книга", 2007. – 176 с.
 Антонюк Ярослав Діяльність СБ ОУН(б) на Волині та Західному Поліссі (1946–1951 рр.) : Монографія. – Луцьк:"Надстир'я-Ключі", 2013. – 228 с.
 УПА розпочинає активні протинімецькі дії (UIA Start the Active anti-German actions) (За матеріалами звіту робочої групи істориків Інституту історії НАН України під керівництвом проф. Станіслава Кульчицького)
 Володимир В'ятрович, Ігор Дерев'яний, Руслан Забілий, Петро Солодь. Українська Повстанська Армія. Історія Нескорених. Третє видання. Львів (2011). .
 Петро Мірчук. Українська Повстанська Армія 1942–1952. Львів 1991. .
 Юрій Киричук. Історія УПА. Тернопіль 1991.
 С.Ф. Хмель. Українська партизанка. Львів 1993.
 Іван Йовик. Нескорена армія. Київ 1995. .
 Анатоль Бедрій. ОУН і УПА. New York – London – Munich – Toronto. 1983.
 Litopys Online. The website of the chronicles of the Ukrainian Insurgent Army. Various works.
 В´ятрович В. М. Друга польсько-українська війна. 1942–1947. – Вид. 2-е, доп. – К.: Вид. дім "Києво-Могилянська академія", 2012. – 368 с.

Polish 

 Wołodymyr Wiatrowycz, Druga wojna polsko-ukraińska 1942–1947, Warszawa 2013, 
 Za to że jesteś Ukraińcem ... : wspomnienia z lat 1944–1947 / wybór, oprac., wstęp i posłowie Bogdan Huk. Koszalin [etc.] : Stowarzyszenie Ukraińców Więźniów Politycznych i Represjonowanych w Polsce, 2012. 400 s. : il. ; 23 cm. 
 
 
 
 Kresowa księga sprawiedliwych 1939–1945

External links 

 Electronic archive of ukrainian liberation movement
 UPA – Ukrainian Insurgent Army 
 Ukrainian Insurgent Army, Encyclopedia of Ukraine
 Chronicle of the Ukrainian Insurgent Army
 ОУН-УПА. Легенда Спротиву. 
 Postcards of Ukrainian Insurgent Army. Kyiv-Toronto, 2008.

 
1942 establishments in Ukraine
1956 disestablishments in Ukraine
Anti-Polish sentiment in Europe
Anti-communism in Ukraine
Anti-communist organizations
Eastern European World War II resistance movements
Guerrilla organizations
History of Ukraine (1918–1991)
Military history of the Soviet Union
Massacres of Poles in Volhynia
Military history of Poland during World War II
Military history of Ukraine
Modern history of Ukraine
National liberation armies
National liberation movements
Organization of Ukrainian Nationalists
The Holocaust in Ukraine
Ukrainian anti-Soviet resistance movement
Ukrainian collaborators with Nazi Germany
Ukrainian independence movement
World War II resistance movements
Far-right terrorism